Yong may refer to:

Yong, Chinese character for "permanence", unique in that the character contains eight strokes common to Chinese characters; see Eight Principles of Yong
Yong, Chinese character for "use" or "function"; in Neo-Confucianism, often associated with Ti ("substance" or "body"); see Essence-Function
Yong or Yongcheng, capital of Qin (state), located in modern Fengxiang County, founded in 677 BC and moved to Yueyang (櫟陽) in 383 BC
Yong, a variant of Yang (surname) (楊/杨)
Korean dragon (yong)
Yong River, Zhejiang Province, China
Yong River (Guangxi), Zhuang Autonomous Region, China
Yong, Ghana, a community in Tamale Metropolitan District in the Northern Region of Ghana

People 
Yong (Chinese name)
Yong (Korean name)
Yong (musician) (born 2000), Norwegian producer, singer, songwriter & YouTuber.
Yong Poovorawan (born 1950), Thai virologist.
Taeyong (born 1995), South Korean rapper, singer, and songwriter.

See also
Jong (disambiguation)
Yung (disambiguation)